Samantha Hughes may refer to:

Samantha Hughes, fictional character in The House of the Devil
Samantha Hughes, fictional character in In Country
Sam Hughes (fighter) (born 1992), American mixed martial artist

See also
Sam Hughes (disambiguation)
Hughes (surname)